The list of American universities with Olympic medalist students and alumni shows the number of Olympic medals won by students and alumni of American universities in Olympic Games up through 2020 Tokyo Summer Olympics. Many of these athletes did not compete for the United States; the American college sports model, in which post-secondary institutions sponsor a wide range of athletic competitions and provide scholarships and subsidies to athletes with little regard for their origin, has the effect of drawing university-age athletes from all over the world to the United States for both academic and athletic study.

This list considers both summer and winter Olympic games, and only those who actually received Olympic medals are counted. Therefore, the list includes Olympic athletes only and excludes coaches, staff managers and so on. In addition, if an athlete attended more than one university, that athlete might show up in the medal count of each university attended. For example, Alma Richards who won the gold medal in the 1912 Stockholm Olympics in the high jump attended BYU prep school (degree), Cornell (degree), University of Southern California (degree) and Stanford. He is listed in the medal count for BYU, Cornell and USC, but Stanford does not include him in its list. Finally, in this list, universities are presented in descending order starting from those with the most Olympic medals.

In the 2020 Tokyo Summer Olympics, the university with the most Olympic medals in the U.S. was Stanford University (26 medals), followed by the University of Southern California (21 medals), the University of Florida (17 medals), UCLA (16 medals) and UC Berkeley (16 medals).

Top 10

11th – 50th

Other universities (51st–)

See also 
Olympic Games
Summer Olympic Games
Winter Olympic Games

References

Notes 

American universities
 Universities
Olympic medals
Universities